The chancellor of Aligarh Muslim University is the ceremonial head of the university. The vice-chancellor of Aligarh Muslim University is the executive head of the university.

Chancellors of AMU
The chancellors of AMU are as follows.

 Sultan Jahan Begum, Ruler of Bhopal (December 1920 - May 1930)
 Mohammed Hamidullah Khan, Ruler of Bhopal (September 1930 - April 1935)
 Mir Osman Ali Khan, The Nizam of Hyderabad (August 1935 - November 1947)
 Syed Raza Ali Khan, The Nawab of Rampur (November 1947 - January 1953)
 Syedna Tahir Saifuddin (April 1953 - April 1965)
 Hafiz Ahmad Saeed Khan, The Nawab of Chhatari (December 1965 - January 1982)
 Prof. A.R. Kidwai, (Aug. 1984 - July 1992)
 Prof. A.M. Khusro (July 1992 - August 1995)
 Hakim Abdul Hameed (August 1996 - August 1999)
 Syedna Burhanuddin (August 1999 - October 2002)
 Justice A.M. Ahmadi (September 2003 - 13 September 2006, January 2007 - January 2010)
 Syedna Mufaddal Saifuddin (April 2015 – present)

Vice-Chancellors of AMU
The vice-chancellors of AMU are as follows.

 Mr. Mohammad Ali Mohammad Khan Raja Saheb of Mahmudabad (December 1, 1920 - February 28, 1923)
 Nawab Mohammad Muzammilullah Khan Sherwani (March 12, 1923 - December 31, 1923 (acting))
Sahibzada Aftab Ahmad Khan (January 1, 1924 - December 31, 1926)
 Nawab Mohammad Muzammilullah Khan Sherwani (January 1, 1927 - February 8, 1929)
 Sir Shah Muhammad Sulaiman (February 9, 1929 - October 19, 1929 (acting))
 Sir Syed Ross Masood (October 20, 1929 - April 30, 1934)
 Sir Dr. Ziauddin Ahmad (April 19, 1935 - April 29, 1938)
 Sir Shah Mohammad Sulaiman (April 30, 1938 - March 13, 1941)
 Sir Dr. Ziauddin Ahmad (April 24, 1941 - December 26, 1946)
Khan Bahadur Obaidur Rahman Khan Sherwani (December 27, 1946 - April 19, 1947 (acting))
 Mr. Zahid Husain (April 20, 1947 - August 7, 1947)
Khan Bahadur Obaidur Rahman Khan Sherwani (August 8, 1947 - October 16, 1947 (acting))
 Nawab Mohammad Ismail Khan (October 17, 1947 - November 28, 1948)
 Dr. Zakir Husain (November 30, 1948 - September 15, 1956)
 Col. B. H. Zaidi (October 7, 1956 - November 6, 1962)
 Mr. Badruddin Tayyabji (November 7, 1962 - February 28, 1965)
 Nawab Ali Yavar Jung (March 1, 1965 - January 5, 1968)
 Prof. Abdul Aleem (January 6, 1968 - January 3, 1974)
 Khaliq Ahmad Nizami (January 3, 1974 - August 30, 1974 (acting))
 Harbans Lal Sharma (August 30, 1974 - December 20, 1974 (acting))
 Prof. A. M. Khusro (December 20, 1974 - December 14, 1979)
 Mohammad Shafi (December 14, 1979 - May 1980 (acting))
 Jagan Nath Prasad (May 1980 - June 1980 (acting))
 Qamar-ul-Hasan Faruqi (June 1980 - June 12, 1980 (acting))
Mr. Saiyid Hamid, IAS (June 12, 1980 - March 26, 1985)
 K.M. Bahauddin (March 26, 1985 - April 7, 1985 (acting))
 Mr. Syed Hasim Ali, IAS (April 8, 1985 - October 4, 1989)
 Wasi-ur-Rahman (October 4, 1989- July 5, 1990 (acting))
 Ashok Bal (July 6, 1990 - August 31, 1990 (acting))
 Mohammad Zaheer (September 1, 1990 - September 3, 1990 (acting))
 Zillur-Rehman (September 4, 1990 - October 15, 1990 (acting))
 Prof. M. N. Faruqui (October 15, 1990 - December 14, 1994)
 Dr. Mahmoodur Rahman, IAS (May 1995 - May 27, 2000)
 Mr. Mohammad Hamid Ansari (May 28, 2000 - March 30, 2002)
 Mohammad Saleemuddin (March 30, 2002 - April 30, 2002 (acting))
 Mr. Naseem Ahmad, IAS (May 2002 - April 2007)
 Prof. P. K. Abdul Aziz (June 2007 - January 2012
 Lt. Gen. Zameer Uddin Shah (Retd.) (May 2012 - May 2017)
 Prof. Tariq Mansoor (May 2017 – present)

References

Cited Sources
 

Vice-Chancellors of the Aligarh Muslim University
Lists of academic chancellors and vice chancellors